Xavier Rubert de Ventós (1 September 1939 – 28 January 2023) was a Spanish philosopher, writer and politician.

Scholarship
Rubert de Ventós obtained a degree in law in 1961 and a doctorate in philosophy from the University of Barcelona in 1965 with a thesis on aesthetics entitled La estética de la abstracción (The Aesthetics of Abstraction).

Rubert de Ventós served as a professor of aesthetics at the Polytechnic University of Catalonia as well as visiting professor at various American universities including Harvard, Berkeley and Cincinnati.

Rubert de Ventós created the Barcelona–New York Chair of Catalan Culture and Language and was a founding member of the New York Institute for Humanities and of the Institut d'Humanitats de Barcelona.

Politics
Rubert de Ventós was arrested three times for his activities as a member of the Workers' Front of Catalonia. In 1975 threats from Falangists forced him into exile in Paris, during which time he was expelled from the University of Barcelona for abandoning his position.

A childhood friend of Pasqual Maragall, Rubert de Ventós joined the Socialist Party of Catalonia and was a member of the Spanish parliament from 1982 to 1986 and of the European Parliament from 1986 to 1994.

Rubert de Ventós was also a member of the Commission for Dignity (comisión para reparar la dignidad y restituir la memoria de las víctimas del franquismo), an entity that calls for the return to their rightful owners of documents that were confiscated at the end of the Civil War and subsequently housed in the General Civil War Archive in Salamanca. 

In November 2012, he signed a public manifesto in which he supported the centre-right Convergence and Union (Convergència i Unió) in the elections to the Parliament of Catalonia.

Works

Catalan
1968 Teoria de la sensibilitat
1978 Ofici de Setmana Santa
1983 Per què filosofia
1987 Pensadors catalans
1991 El cortesà i el seu fantasma
1992 De filosofia (with Mercè Rius)
1993 Manies i afrodismes
1999 Catalunya: de la identitat a la independència
2004 Filosofia d'estar per casa
2006 Teoria de la sensibilitat nacionalista
2012 Dimonis íntims

Castilian
1963 El arte ensimismado
1971 Moral y nueva cultura
1973 Utopías de la sensualidad y métodos del sentido
1974 La estética y sus herejías 
1975 Ensayos sobre el desorden
1980 De la Modernidad. Ensayos de filosofía crítica
1984 Filosofía y/o Política
1984 Las metopías: metodologías y métodos de nuestro tiempo
1986 Europa y otros ensayos
1987 El Laberinto de la Hispanidad
1990 ¿Porqué filosofía? (traducción del catalán)
1993 Manías, amores y otros oficios
1994 Nacionalismos. El laberinto de la identidad
2000 Dios, entre otros inconvenientes

Prizes
1963 City of Barcelona prize for El arte ensimismado
1969 Lletra d'Or for Teoria de la sensibilitat
1973 Anagrama essay prize for La estética y sus herejías
1987 Espejo de España prize for El laberinto de la hispanidad
1991 Josep Pla award for El cortesà i el seu fantasma
1999 St George's Cross (Creu de Sant Jordi), decoration awarded by the Catalan government

References

External links

Conversation with the philosopher Xavier Rubert de Ventós in English.
Personal page of Xavier Rubert de Ventós, in English, Catalan and Castilian.
Xavier Rubert de Ventós en lletrA, el espacio de literatura catalana de la Universidad Abierta de Cataluña, in Castilian.
El autor en Qui és qui de les lletres catalanes, in Catalan.

1939 births
2023 deaths
Philosophers_from_Catalonia
University of Barcelona alumni
Academic staff of the University of Barcelona
Academic staff of the Autonomous University of Barcelona
Academic staff of the Polytechnic University of Catalonia
Members of the Institute for Catalan Studies
Socialists' Party of Catalonia politicians
Catalan_Anti-Francoists
Socialists' Party of Catalonia MEPs
MEPs 1984–1989
MEPs 1989–1994
Members of the 2nd Congress of Deputies (Spain)